The Hi-Jacks were a Filipino rock band that formed in the early 1960s. The group was established during a period when rock bands, also known locally as "combos", rose in popularity in the Philippines among young people. Many of their songs consist of covers of pop music from the United States and the United Kingdom, such as "Pa Pa Ou Mau Mau" and "Hey Jude".

In 1969, the Hi-Jacks won the first Awit Award for Vocal Group of the Year (English, Local Division). Later that year, they signed a contract to perform in Tokyo, Japan for six months. By 1972, they had become a regular act at a club in Manila called D'Flame when the group was acquired by the music label Sunshine, a division of Vicor Music.

Towards the late 1980s, the group, which had since become composed of seven members, was the regular act at the Cabaret of the Playboy Club in Manila. In November 1987, the group performed at an Elvis Presley tribute concert held at the Manila Hotel to benefit the Foundation for the Blind of the Philippines, Inc. In February 1988, the band performed as the backing group of Ramon "RJ" Jacinto for the program "Jam Session '88," held at the Coconut Palace in Manila.

In 1994, the band held a reunion concert at Jacinto's RJ Bistro in Makati on October 6.

Singles

Filmography
1964: Let's Go
1966: I Just Need Your Love
1967: Let's Hang On!
1967: Operation: Discotheque
1968: Let's Go... Hippie

References

External links

1960s establishments in the Philippines
1970s disestablishments in the Philippines
Filipino rock music groups